Amandla!: A Revolution in Four-Part Harmony is a 2002 documentary film depicting the struggles of black South Africans against the injustices of Apartheid through the use of music. The film takes its name from the Zulu and Xhosa word amandla, which means power.

The film was produced by Sherry Simpson Dean,  Desiree Markgraaff and Lee Hirsch. Simpson Dean and Hirsch also produced the film's soundtrack of the same name. The collection of  authentic South African "Freedom Songs" was executive produced by Dave Matthews  and his label ATO Records.

Synopsis
South African musicians, playwrights, poets and activists recall the struggle against apartheid from the 1940s to the 1990s that stripped black citizens of South Africa of basic human rights, and the important role that music played in that struggle. The documentary uses a mixture of interviews,  musical performances and historical film footage. Among the South Africans who take part are Miriam Makeba, Abdullah Ibrahim, Hugh Masekela, Vusi Mahlasela and others.

The freedom songs heard in the film have an important historical context. Particularly in the United States, freedom songs have referred to protest songs of the abolitionist, civil rights, and labor movements. Yet, in South Africa, the songs take on a different meaning, referring to a unique collection of songs tied to the struggle for racial equality during the 20th century. Stylistically, freedom songs originated in choir as a unifying and prevalent genre that combined southern African signing traditions with Christian hymns. Most of the songs have simple melodies and are sung a cappella. More importantly, they are composed and sung in groups, and often reflect changing political circumstances and attitudes.

The film is bookmarked by the exhumation of the remains of Vuyisile Mini, trade union organizer, member of the African National Congress, and composer of "Beware Verwoerd" and other protest songs. Mini was executed by the apartheid regime in 1964.

Awards
The film won the Audience Award and the Freedom of Expression Award at the 2002 Sundance Film Festival, where it was also nominated for the Grand Jury Prize. It also won awards at several other film festivals, including those in Telluride, Colorado, Durban International Film Festival, South Africa, and Sydney, Australia.

Soundtrack

 "AMANDLA!", Protest meeting, Johannesburg
 "When You Come Back", Vusi Mahlasela
 "Lizobuya", Mbongeni Ngema
 "Meadowlands", Nancy Jacobs and sisters
 "Sad Times", Bad Times, The Original Cast of King Kong
 "Senzeni Na?", Vusi Mahlasela & Harmonious Serenade Choir
 "Beware Verwoerd (Naants’ Indod’ Emnyama)", Miriam Makeba
 "Y’zinga", Robben-Island Prison Singers
 "Stimela", Hugh Masekela
 "Injamblo/Hambani Kunye Ne – Vangeli", Pretoria Central Prison
 "Mannenberg", Abdullah Ibrahim
 "Nkosi Sikelel' iAfrika", Soweto Community Hall
 "Thina Lomhlaba Siwugezi", Vusi Mahlasela
 "Mayibuye", Vusi Mahlasela
 "Thina Sizwe", SABC Choir
 "Folk Vibe No.  1", Tananas
 "Dabula Ngesi'bam", Soweto Community Hall
 "Sobahiya Abazali Ekhaya", Amandla Group
 "Bring Him Back Home (Nelson Mandela)", Hugh Masekela
 "Did You Hear That Sound? (Dreamtime Improv)", Abdullah Ibrahim
 "S'bali", Joe Nina
 "Makuliwe", Soweto Community HalL
 "Bahleli Bonke", Miriam Makeba
 "Kuzobenjani Na?", Vusi Mahlasela
 "You Strike The Rock...", Sophie Mgcina and Dolly Rathebe
 "The Untold Story", Sibongile Khumalo with Themba Mkhize
 "Iyo", Harmonious Serenade Choir
 "Usilethela Uxolo (Nelson Mandela Brings Us Peace)", The African National Congress Choir
 "Toyi - Toyi Introduction/Kramat", Abdullah Ibrahim

References

External links
 

Documentary films about apartheid
2002 films
Documentary films about African music
Opposition to apartheid in South Africa
2000s English-language films
Zulu-language films
Films shot in South Africa
2002 soundtrack albums
Documentary film soundtracks
Artisan Entertainment films
+
South African documentary films